"Is This the End" is a 1983 song by R&B/Pop group New Edition, written and produced by Maurice Starr, and is the second single from their debut album, Candy Girl.

An R&B hit, the single peaked at number eight on the R&B singles chart and at number eighty-five pop. Ralph Tresvant sings primary lead, with Ricky Bell handling the outro.

Charts

References

1982 singles
1983 singles
New Edition songs
Songs written by Michael Jonzun
Songs written by Maurice Starr
Song recordings produced by Maurice Starr
Warlock Records singles
1982 songs